The FIU Panthers women's basketball team represents Florida International University in women's basketball. The school competes in Conference USA in Division I of the National Collegiate Athletic Association (NCAA). The Panthers play home basketball games at FIU Arena in Westchester, Florida.

Postseason

NCAA Division II tournament results
The Panthers, then known as the Golden Panthers, made three appearances in the NCAA Division II women's basketball tournament. They had a combined record of 1–3.

AIAW College Division/Division II
The Panthers, then known as the Golden Panthers, made one appearance in the AIAW National Division II basketball tournament, with a combined record of 0–1.

History
They have won seven tournaments, 6 while in the Trans America Athletic Conference, and one while they played in the Sun Belt Conference. They also appeared in the NCAA Division II Tournament in 1983, 1986, and 1987. As of the end of the 2015–16 season, the Panthers have an all-time record of 692–466 since beginning play in 1975. All wins from the 2003–04 season (11) were vacated due to NCAA sanctions.

NCAA tournament results

References

External links